Mathieu Brodeur (born June 21, 1990) is a Canadian former professional ice hockey defenceman. He was selected by the Phoenix Coyotes in the 3rd round (76th overall) of the 2008 NHL Entry Draft.

Playing career
Prior to turning professional, Brodeur played major junior hockey in the Quebec Major Junior Hockey League with the Cape Breton Screaming Eagles. On April 2, 2010, Brodeur was signed by the Phoenix Coyotes to an entry-level contract.

Brodeur made his professional debut with the San Antonio Rampage, Phoenix's AHL affiliate at the time. Brodeur spent his last three years within the Coyotes organization with the Portland Pirates, before leaving as a free agent to sign a one-year deal with his third AHL team, the Chicago Wolves, on July 30, 2014.

Brodeur began the 2017–18 season in the AHL with the Springfield Thunderbirds, after signing a professional try-out contract on October 3, 2017. After 7 games he returned to the Thunder where he played in 48 games for 29 points throughout the season, while enduring two more AHL stints with the Crunch and Utica Comets.

As a free agent, Brodeur left for France, agreeing to a one-year deal with Dragons de Rouen of the Ligue Magnus on July 19, 2018.

After parts of two seasons abroad, Brodeur returned to the ECHL for the 2020–21 season, agreeing a contract with former club the Adirondack Thunder on August 27, 2020. With the Thunder opting to commence a hiatus due to the ongoing COVID-19 pandemic, Brodeur was immediately released as a free agent and later signed a contract to continue in the ECHL with the Fort Wayne Komets on December 8, 2020. In adding a veteran presence to the blueline, Brodeur added 4 goals and 10 points in 48 regular season games. In the post-season he appeared in 13 playoff contests helping Fort Wayne capture their first Kelly Cup in a championship victory over the South Carolina Stingrays.

As a free agent, Brodeur continued in the ECHL, joining hometown provincial club Trois-Rivières Lions, for their inaugural season in 2021–22 season on July 9, 2021.

After a game against the Reading Royals on January 25, 2022, Brodeur announced his retirement from professional hockey.

Career statistics

Awards and honours

References

External links

1990 births
Adirondack Thunder players
Albany Devils players
Arizona Coyotes draft picks
Canadian ice hockey defencemen
Cape Breton Screaming Eagles players
Chicago Wolves players
Dragons de Rouen players
Fort Wayne Komets players
HK Dukla Trenčín players
Ice hockey people from Quebec
Las Vegas Wranglers players
Living people
People from Saint-Eustache, Quebec
Portland Pirates players
San Antonio Rampage players
Springfield Thunderbirds players
Syracuse Crunch players
Trois-Rivières Lions players
Utica Comets players
Canadian expatriate ice hockey players in the United States
Canadian expatriate ice hockey players in France
Canadian expatriate ice hockey players in Slovakia